The 1986 Individual Long Track World Championship was the 16th edition of the FIM speedway Individual Long Track World Championship. The event was held on 14 September 1986 in Pfarrkirchen, Germany, which was West Germany at the time.

The world title was won by Erik Gundersen of Denmark for the second time.

Final Classification 

 E = eliminated (no further ride)
 f = fell
 ef = engine failure
 x = excluded

References 

1986
Speedway competitions in Germany
Sport in West Germany
Sports competitions in West Germany
Motor
Motor